In October 1894 the Elections and Qualifications Committee conducted a re-count of the 1894 Grenfell election, in which George Greene had been declared elected by a margin of 2 votes over Michael Loughnane. The Elections and Qualifications Committee consisted of 9 members, 5  (Thomas Bavister, William McMillan, Philip Morton, Varney Parkes and Bernhard Wise) and four  (Paddy Crick, James Gormly, James Hayes, and Francis Wright).

The committee declared that George Greene had not been elected the member for Grenfell, however no by-election was conducted. Instead the committee declared that Michael Loughnane based on its own count of the result.

Dates

Result

The Elections and Qualifications Committee conducted a re-count of the 1894 Grenfell election and declared that George Greene had not been elected the member for Grenfell. No by-election was conducted, instead the committee declared that Michael Loughnane had been elected.

Aftermath
This was the 6th and final occasion on which the Elections and Qualifications Committee overturned the result of an election without ordering a fresh election. A public meeting at Grenfell expressed indignation at the unfairness of the decision. The meeting called for the abolition of the parliamentary Elections and Qualifications Committee and its replacement by a tribunal outside of parliament. The committee continued however until 1928 when the Court of Disputed Returns was established as a special jurisdiction of the Supreme Court.

Michael Loughnane only held the seat for 8 months, as he did not stand for the 1895 Grenfell election and George Greene regained the seat.

See also
Electoral results for the district of Grenfell
List of New South Wales state by-elections

Notes

References

1894 elections in Australia
New South Wales state by-elections
1890s in New South Wales